Ventoux AOC (known as Côtes du Ventoux AOC until 2008) is a wine-growing AOC in the southeastern region of the Rhône wine region of France, where the wines are produced in 51 communes of the Vaucluse département along the lower slopes of the Ventoux mountain and at the foot of the Vaucluse Mountains. The neighbouring appellation of Luberon AOC stretches along its southern border and is separated from it by the Calavon river.

The three main areas of the region, the Malaucène basin, the foothills of the Mont Ventoux to  the east of Carpentras and to the north of Cavaillon are less ravaged by the Mistral due to some shelter afforded by the Ventoux-Vaucluse-Luberon mountain range.
Archeological discoveries of wine making  equipment have dated that wine has been produced in the area at least since around 30 AD.

Wines

Red and rosé wines are made from, Grenache, Syrah, Cinsault, Mourvèdre, and Carignan (maximum 30%). Other varieties which may be used to a maximum of 20%.The red wine is distinctly characterised by its aromas of black fruit, spice, and pepper. 
White wines are produced from Clairette blanche, Bourboulenc, Grenache blanc, and Roussane (maximum 30%). 
A Primeur wine is also produced in all three colours.
The minimum alcoholic content for all wines is decreed at 11%.
The reds, which comprise approximately 80% of the production, are light and fruity. All wines are generally consumed while they are still young.

Economy
The Ventoux wines are produced by a total of 1,339 concerns which include 1,315 growers, 113 private wineries, 16 cooperative wineries, and 8 producer/merchants.

The vineyards are in the communes of Apt, Aubignan, Beaumettes, Beaumont-du-Ventoux, Bédoin, Blauvac, Bonnieux, Cabrières-d'Avignon, Caromb, Carpentras, Caseneuve, Crestet, Crillon-le-Brave, Entrechaux, Flassan, Fontaine-de-Vaucluse, Gargas, Gignac, Gordes, Goult, Joucas, Lagnes, La Roque-sur-Pernes, Le Barroux, Le Beaucet, Lioux, Loriol-du-Comtat, Malaucène, Malemort-du-Comtat, Maubec, Mazan, Méthamis, Modène, Mormoiron, Murs, Pernes, Robion, Roussillon, Rustrel, Saignon, Saumane, Saint-Didier, Saint-Hippolyte-le-Graveyron, Saint-Martin-de-Castillon, Saint-Pantaléon, Saint-Pierre-de-Vassols, Saint-Saturnin-lès-Apt, Venasque, Viens, Villars and Villes-sur-Auzon.

See also

 List of Vins de Primeur

References

Rhône wine AOCs
1973 establishments in France
Geography of Vaucluse